Policy Connect is an independent, cross-party not-for-profit organization with two decades in policy work, overseeing the research and delivery of more than 50 key publications. The think tank has a history of running forums, commissions and All-Party Parliamentary Groups and is based in London. The think tank works to influence the formation of public policy in the UK through its programme of policy research and collaborative events and seminars.

Founded in 1995 by Labour MP Barry Sheerman, it conducts research across a range of policy areas, most notably: sustainability, education and skills, design and manufacturing, health, and energy safety. Sheerman is the current Chair of the Board of Policy Connect, and Chris White was formerly the Vice-Chair. Both have been also Co-Chairs of the All-Party Parliamentary Manufacturing Group.

It works closely with leading politicians, civil servants, academics and heads of industry, many of whom chair specific Policy Connect groups or research inquiries.

Its head office is located in Southwark, near the Tate Modern.

Organizational structure 
Policy Connect runs over 17 political groups, for aaommissions each working within a different policy field, as well as providing the secretariat to several formal All-Party Parliamentary Groups. As such, the organisation has at times been described as a ‘network’ of policy groups, a term that reflects both the independence yet interconnection of the various groups that comprise Policy Connect as a whole. Policy Connect works in five primary policy areas:

Sustainability 

Westminster Sustainable Business Forum
All-Party Parliamentary Climate Change Group
All-Party Parliamentary Sustainable Built Environment
All-Party Parliamentary Sustainable Resource Group
Sustainable Resource Forum
Carbon Connect

Manufacturing, Design & Innovation 

All-Party Parliamentary Design and Innovation Group
All-Party Parliamentary Manufacturing Group
Design Commission
Manufacturing Commission

Energy Safety 

All-Party Parliamentary Carbon Monoxide Group

Skills & Education 

All-Party Parliamentary Group for Skills and Employment
Skills Commission
Higher Education Commission

Health 

All-Party Parliamentary Health Group

See also 
 List of think tanks in the United Kingdom

References

External links 
 

Think tanks based in the United Kingdom
1995 establishments in the United Kingdom
Think tanks established in 1995
Non-profit organisations based in London